Nawansher Urban is one of the 51 union councils of Abbottabad District in Khyber-Pakhtunkhwa province of Pakistan. It is located in the north of the district. It is one of the oldest settlements in Abbottabad district.

Sibdivisions

It is further subdivided into some mohallahs. Some of them are as listed below.
Mohallah Mohammad Zai,
Nia Mohallah,
Mohallah Shoaib Zai,
Mohallah Imran Zai,
Mohallah Khalil Zai,
Mohallah Moosa Zai,
Mohallah Qilla.
Mohallah Dhodehal,
Orush colony, Ehtesham colony
jogan, Ilyasi

Tribal

References

Union councils of Abbottabad District

fr:Nawansher Urban Source Farjad khan jadoon member Nawanshahr